For the church building designed by Frank Lloyd Wright see Unitarian Meeting House (Madison, Wisconsin)

Unitarian Meeting House is a Grade I listed place of worship in Ipswich, Suffolk. It is a member of the General Assembly of Unitarian and Free Christian Churches, the umbrella organisation for British Unitarians.

The present building was opened by John Fairfax in 1700. Much of the original interior remains intact.

Ministers

External links
Official website

Unitarian chapels in England
Grade I listed churches in Ipswich